Carnock is a village and parish of Fife, Scotland,  west of Dunfermline. The name of the village derives from Scottish Gaelic, from ceàrn ("corner"), with a suffix denoting a toponym, thus giving "[the] corner place". Carnock is known to have had military significance in antiquity. The civil parish had a population of 5,927 .

Notable places 

On the Main Street of Carnock lies a Parish church which was built in 1840, though in the nearby kirkyard lies the remains of the original 12th-century church which was rebuilt in 1602.

Nextdoor to the church is Carnock Primary School, this school serves both Carnock and Gowkhall.  The school was built in 1864 with an extension added in 1912 and another in 2007.  The main building consists of 4 classrooms and a medway hut used for various purposes.

Carnock Olympian:- Former pupil at Carnock Primary was Debbie Knox part of the Gold Medal winning team at the Winter Olympics in Curling at Salt Lake City. She did come back to the school to show her Medal to the pupils and crown the Gala Queen.

On Main Street is the 16th-century The Carnock Inn, one of the oldest buildings in the village, which became a public house in 1884. Next door to the Pub is a local craft shop / studio in what used to be the village Post Office . Now Oakley serves as the Post Office for Carnock.

The village also boasts a Community Centre built in 2005 and available for hire via Fife council.

History
In 1774 upon Carneil hill, near Carnock, several urns containing Roman coinage were discovered.
 It is believed that the local inhabitants, the Horestii, unsuccessfully defended this location against the Roman general Gnaeus Julius Agricola. The local names Easter Camps and Wester Camps were suspected by Thomson to originate from this time as reported by Lewis.

The pre-Reformation church of St Caernach (which gives its name to the village) was run by the red friars of Scotlandwell and dates from 1250. The church continued in use after the Reformation and was rebuilt in 1602 and 1641 before being abandoned in 1840 when a new church was built by John Henderson.

After the Reformation in 1560 the church in Carnock was under the control variously of Saline to the north and Dunfermline to the east. Only in 1592 did it get its own minister, the ecclesiastical historian John Row, who served the parish until 1645. He was succeeded by Rev George Belfrage who translated from Culross in 1647.  He died and was replaced by John Shaw in 1664 who was translated to Kinnaird, Perthshire in 1679. His successor  Thomas Marshall was deprived of office in 1689 for not signing the National Covenant. William Innes was minister 1693 to 1696. In 1699 James Hog took over and was a noted theological author. Daniel Hunter succeeded him in 1730, also serving as chaplain to the local family of Col Erskine. He died in 1739.

The parish was then overseen by Rev Thomas Gillespie from 1741 to 1752. Thomas Gillespie was founder of the Relief Synod which was latterly incorporated into the United Presbyterian Church. Gillespie was followed by Rev Thomas Adie in 1753 who died in 1780 and was replaced by Rev Alexander Thomson who died in 1826 to be replaced briefly by Robert Thomson. In 1827 Rev William Gilston took over. Gilston was responsible for the building of the new church in 1840 but moved to the Free Church of Scotland in the Disruption of 1843 and was minister there until death in 1881 (a ministry in Carnock of 55 years!). Meanwhile the Church of Scotland placed Rev Adam Black Douglas in their church from 1843.

Transport
The village has two bus stops.

Eastbound Traveline Code : 34325459
Westbound Traveline Code : 34325439
Services run from Dunfermline bus station serving Gowkhall, Oakley and Saline, Fife.

Notes

See also
Carnock's listed buildings

Villages in Fife
Parishes in Fife